Monica Conti (born 10 August 1964) is a former Italian long-distance runner and cross-country runner who competed at individual senior level at the World Athletics Cross Country Championships (1989).

References

External links
 

1964 births
Living people
Italian female long-distance runners
Italian female cross country runners
Sportspeople from Florence
20th-century Italian women
21st-century Italian women